The Canon Extender EF lenses are a group of teleconverter lenses made by Canon. These lenses are used between any compatible EF type lens and any of the Canon EOS line of cameras. When used with a compatible lens, they will multiply the focal length of the lens by a factor of either 1.4x or 2x, at the cost of decreasing the lens' aperture by 1 or 2 stops respectively. For example, using a 1.4x or 2x extender with the Canon EF 500mm f/4L IS USM would result in a 700mm f/5.6 or 1000mm f/8 lens.

Overview
Canon has released six models:

 1.4x  (1988)
 1.4x II  (2001)
 1.4x III  (2010)
 2x  (1987)
 2x II  (2001)
 2x III  (2010)

Technical information
The extenders are constructed with metal bayonets, and engineered plastic ends. There are no moving parts, other than the lens latch lock. Three generations of the extenders exist: the older 1.4× and 2×, the 1.4× II and 2× II, and the 1.4× III and 2.0× III. The II versions have weather-sealing and anti-reflective surfaces inside the extender body. The optical construction of the 1.4× versions are of a five-element design. Both 2× versions use seven elements, although the optical formula of the II version is different to improve optical performance. The III versions of the extenders have improved autofocus performance as well increased image quality over the II, and their front and rear elements are coated with fluorine anti-smear coating to be easier to clean.

Compatibility information

These Extender EF lenses can only be used with lenses that have a compatible mount. While all EF lenses have mount designs that can be used with EOS bodies, only lenses with accordant mounts can be used with the extender EF lenses. These lenses must have the clearance to accept the protruding lens on the extender, as well as 10 (3 extra) electronic contacts for proper electronic communication with the extender. These extra electronic contacts are used for sending the correct aperture information to the body.

When a compatible lens is used with a 1.4× or 2× extender, it will cost the lens a one or two stop decline in aperture size, respectively. Autofocus speed of any used EF lens is also affected. When used with the 1.4× extender, autofocus speed is reduced by 50%. When used with the 2× extender, autofocus speed is reduced by 75%. Image stabilization may not work on lenses that are equipped with an extender, or on certain EOS bodies.

Some EOS bodies are unable to autofocus when the maximum aperture of a lens is smaller than f/5.6. Professional-level bodies are capable of autofocusing lenses with a maximum aperture of f/8, but only with the centre autofocus point. With a 2× extender a 400mm f/4 lens would have an equivalent focal length of 800mm and a maximum aperture of f/8, in which case autofocus would only be available with professional bodies. With the same converter a 400mm f/5.6 lens would have a maximum aperture of f/11 and autofocus would be disabled.

Though not specified by Canon as such, users have reported that the tilt-shift lenses in Canon's line-up can also be used with the extenders. However, when used with an extender, the lens will not pass on the correct aperture to the camera. The focal length stored in the Exif data will also be incorrect.

List of compatible EF lenses
The following is a list of EF lenses that are compatible with the Extender EF lenses together with their resulting focal lengths, and apertures. Also listed is the autofocus and image stabilization functionality.

List of EOS bodies that can AF at 8

Canon EOS bodies that have a high density, high precision auto-focus sensor with 45 or more AF points are able to autofocus at maximum apertures of 8.

 Canon EOS-1D X Mark II
 Canon EOS-1D X Mark III
 Canon EOS-1D X (with firmware version 1.1.1)  
 Canon EOS 5D Mark III (with firmware version 1.2.1)
 Canon EOS 5DS
 Canon EOS 5DS R
 Canon EOS 5D Mark IV
Canon EOS 6D Mark II
 Canon EOS 7D Mark II
 Canon EOS 80D
 Canon EOS 77D
 Canon EOS 90D
 Canon EOS 800D/Rebel T7i
 Canon EOS 850D/Rebel T8i
 Canon EOS-1D Mark IV
 Canon EOS-1Ds Mark III
 Canon EOS-1D Mark III
 Canon EOS-1Ds Mark II
 Canon EOS-1D Mark II
 Canon EOS-1D Mark II N
 Canon EOS-1Ds
 Canon EOS-1D
 Canon EOS-1V
 Canon EOS 3

Dual Pixel CMOS AF at 11
Canon EOS bodies that have Dual Pixel CMOS AF like the 70D and later models support autofocusing in Liveview mode, with maximum apertures as small as f/11.

See also
Kenko
Nikon F-mount teleconverter
Teleconverter

Notes

Citations

Sources

 EF LENS WORK III DESIGN SPECIFICATIONS & LENS MAPS

Canon EF lenses
Teleconverter lenses